Emmanuelle Riva (24 February 1927 – 27 January 2017) was a French actress, best known for her roles in the films Hiroshima mon amour (1959) and Amour (2012).

Riva was nominated for a BAFTA Award for her role in Hiroshima mon amour, and won Best Actress at the Venice Film Festival for Thérèse Desqueyroux (1962). For her lead role in Michael Haneke's Amour, she won a BAFTA Award and the César Award, and was nominated for an Academy Award.

Early life
Riva was born Paulette Germaine Riva on 24 February 1927 in Cheniménil, France, the daughter of Jeanne Fernande (née Nourdin), a seamstress, and René Alfred Riva, a sign painter from Italy.

Growing up in Remiremont, Riva showed an early passion for acting, performing in plays at her local theatre, but worked for several years as a seamstress. After seeing an advertisement on a local newspaper, Riva applied to an acting school in Paris.

At 26, she moved to Paris to pursue acting despite her family's objections. In 1954, she performed her first role on stage in a Paris production of George Bernard Shaw's Arms and the Man. In 1957, Riva made her onscreen acting debut in the TV series Énigmes de l'histoire.

Career

Film
Riva was cast as one of the leads in Hiroshima mon amour (1959), a film directed by Alain Resnais and written by Marguerite Duras, in which she played a French actress having an affair with a Japanese architect (Eiji Okada) in Hiroshima. Her performance was nominated for a BAFTA Award for Best Foreign Actress in 1960. She next appeared in Gillo Pontecorvo's Kapò (1960), Jean-Pierre Melville's Léon Morin, Priest (1961) and Georges Franju's Thérèse Desqueyroux (1962), for which she won the Volpi Cup for Best Actress at the 23rd Venice International Film Festival. Riva also appeared in Krzysztof Kieślowski's Three Colors: Blue (1993), Tonie Marshall's Venus Beauty Institute (1999), Julie Delpy's Skylab (2011) and Fiona Gordon & Dominique Abel 's Lost in Paris (2016).

Riva starred in Michael Haneke's film Amour (2012) with Jean-Louis Trintignant, playing an elderly music teacher being cared for by her husband after a series of debilitating strokes. She won the BAFTA Award for Best Actress in a Leading Role in 2013 for her performance, and was nominated for the Academy Award for Best Actress. Riva traveled to the 85th Academy Awards ceremony, which was held on her 86th birthday, but Jennifer Lawrence won for Silver Linings Playbook instead. At 85, when she was nominated, Riva was the oldest ever Best Actress nominee and the second-oldest acting nominee after Gloria Stuart, who was 87 when she was nominated for Titanic (1997).

Other works
Riva had an extensive theatre career in Paris. In 2001, she performed in Medea at the Festival d'Avignon. She appeared occasionally on French television. Riva returned to the Paris stage in February 2014, co-starring with Anne Consigny in the Marguerite Duras play Savannah Bay at the Théâtre de l'Atelier.

While filming Hiroshima mon amour, Riva photographed Hiroshima; a half-century later these photographs were exhibited at the Nikon Salon and issued in book form in France and Japan. Riva was a published poet.

Personal life
Riva led a private life, never married and did not have children. She had a partner, who died in 1999. Riva owned a fourth-floor walk-up apartment in the Latin Quarter of Paris, and lived there for more than half a century.

Death
Riva died from cancer on 27 January 2017 in Paris, four weeks before her 90th birthday. A memorial service was held on 4 February 2017 at Saint-Germain de Charonne church in the 20th arrondissement of Paris; she was then buried in Charonne cemetery.

Selected filmography

Bibliography

See also
 List of oldest and youngest Academy Award winners and nominees

References

External links

 
 Emmanuelle Riva at NewWaveFilm.com

1927 births
2017 deaths
20th-century French actresses
21st-century French actresses
21st-century women photographers
Best Actress BAFTA Award winners
Best Actress César Award winners
Best Actress Lumières Award winners
Commandeurs of the Ordre des Arts et des Lettres
Deaths from cancer in France
European Film Award for Best Actress winners
French film actresses
French photographers
French people of Italian descent
French people of Lombard descent
French stage actresses
French women photographers
French women poets
People from Vosges (department)
Photography in Japan
Volpi Cup for Best Actress winners